There have been four Berry Baronetcies – all in the Baronetage of the United Kingdom.

Berry baronets of Catton, Yorkshire
Created in the Baronetage of the United Kingdom 12 December 1806
Sir Edward Berry, 1st Baronet
On his death the baronetcy became extinct.

Berry baronets of Hackwood Park, Hampshire
Created in the Baronetage of the United Kingdom 4 July 1921
Sir William Berry, 1st Baronet
He was subsequently created Viscount Camrose in 1941 with which title the baronetcy remains merged.
The baronetcy is unproven.

Berry baronets of Farnham Royal
Created in the Baronetage of the United Kingdom 25 January 1928
Sir Gomer Berry, 1st Baronet
He was subsequently created Viscount Kemsley in 1945 with which title the baronetcy remains merged.

Sir Bisset Berry

Sir William Bisset Berry KC (26 July 1839 – 8 June 1922) (knighted ante 1901) was a South African politician and the fourth Speaker of the Legislative Assembly of the Cape Colony.

References

Baronetcies in the Baronetage of the United Kingdom
Extinct baronetcies in the Baronetage of the United Kingdom